The 2011 Sheikh Jassim Cup was the 33rd edition of the league cup competition for football teams from Qatar.

Al-Arabi are the defending champions.

Groups 
18 clubs from the Qatar Stars League and Qatari 2nd Division were drawn into 4 groups. The winners of each group qualify for the semi-finals.

All group games are played in one 'host' location, instead of the common home and away format used in other competitions

Standings

Group A

Group B

Group C

Group D

Semi finals

Final

2011
2011–12 in Qatari football
2011 domestic association football cups